SHARON (Single reactor system for High activity Ammonium Removal Over Nitrite) is a sewage treatment process.

A partial nitrification process of sewage treatment used for the removal of ammonia and organic nitrogen components from wastewater flow streams. The process results in stable nitrite formation, rather than complete oxidation to nitrate. Nitrate formation by nitrite oxidising bacteria (NOB) (such as Nitrobacter) is prevented by adjusting temperature, pH, and retention time to select for nitrifying ammonia oxidising bacteria (AOB) (such as Nitrosomonas).

Denitrification of waste streams utilizing SHARON reactors can proceed with an anoxic reduction, such as anammox.

References

External links 
  M2T Technologies

Anaerobic digestion